The 1971 San Francisco Giants season was the Giants' 89th year in Major League Baseball, their 14th year in San Francisco since their move from New York following the 1957 season, and their 12th at Candlestick Park. The team finished in first place in the National League West with a 90–72 record.  The Giants faced the Pittsburgh Pirates in the 1971 National League Championship Series, losing three games to one.

Offseason
 December 30, 1970: Ron Hunt was traded by the Giants to the Montreal Expos for Dave McDonald.

Regular season

The Giants battled their arch rival, the Los Angeles Dodgers, throughout the season for the NL West Division lead.  The Giants led by 8.5 games on September 1.  In mid September the Dodgers won 8 in a row, including 5 over the Giants to narrow the gap to one game. On the final day of the season, rookie Dave Kingman homered, leading the Giants to a win over the San Diego Padres to take the division crown, allowing Juan Marichal, Willie Mays, and Willie McCovey to play in the post season for the last time together.
September 5, 1971: In a game against the Giants, J. R. Richard of the Houston Astros struck out 15 batters in his very first game, tying a Major League record first set by Karl Spooner.

Season standings

Record vs. opponents

Notable transactions
 May 29, 1971: George Foster was traded by the Giants to the Cincinnati Reds for Frank Duffy and Vern Geishert.
 June 1, 1971: Bob Heise was traded by the Giants to the Milwaukee Brewers for Floyd Wicker.
 June 8, 1971: 1971 Major League Baseball draft
Frank Riccelli was drafted by the Giants in the 1st round (18th pick).
Willie Prall was drafted by the Giants in the 3rd round.

Game log and schedule

|-  style="text-align:center; background:#bfb;"
| 1 || April 6 || @ Padres || || || || || San Diego Stadium || || ||
|-  style="text-align:center; background:#bfb;"
| 2 || April 7 || @ Padres || || || || || San Diego Stadium || || ||
|-  style="text-align:center; background:#fbb;"
| 3 || April 8 || @ Padres || || || || || San Diego Stadium || || ||
|-  style="text-align:center; background:#bfb;"
| 4 || April 10 || @ Cardinals || || || || || Busch Memorial Stadium || || ||
|-  style="text-align:center; background:#fbb;"
| 5 || April 11 || @ Cardinals || || || || || Busch Memorial Stadium || || ||
|-  style="text-align:center; background:#bfb;"
| 6 || April 11 || @ Cardinals || || || || || Busch Memorial Stadium || || ||
|-  style="text-align:center; background:#bfb;"
| 7 || April 12 || Padres || || || || || Candlestick Park || || ||
|-  style="text-align:center; background:#bfb;"
| 8 || April 14 || Astros || || || || || Candlestick Park || || ||
|-  style="text-align:center; background:#bfb;"
| 9 || April 15 || Astros || || || || || Candlestick Park || || ||
|-  style="text-align:center; background:#bfb;"
| 10 || April 16 || Cubs || || || || || Candlestick Park || || ||
|-  style="text-align:center; background:#bfb;"
| 11 || April 17 || Cubs || || || || || Candlestick Park || || ||
|-  style="text-align:center; background:#bfb;"
| 12 || April 18 || Cubs || || || || || Candlestick Park || || ||
|-  style="text-align:center; background:#bfb;"
| 13 || April 18 || Cubs || || || || || Candlestick Park || || ||
|-  style="text-align:center; background:#bfb;"
| 14 || April 19 || Cardinals || || || || || Candlestick Park || || ||
|-  style="text-align:center; background:#fbb;"
| 15 || April 20 || Cardinals || || || || || Candlestick Park || || ||
|-  style="text-align:center; background:#fbb;"
| 16 || April 21 || Cardinals || || || || || Candlestick Park || || ||
|-  style="text-align:center; background:#bfb;"
| 17 || April 23 || @ Pirates || || || || || Three Rivers Stadium || || ||
|-  style="text-align:center; background:#bfb;"
| 18 || April 24 || @ Pirates || || || || || Three Rivers Stadium || || ||
|-  style="text-align:center; background:#fbb;"
| 19 || April 25 || @ Pirates || || || || || Three Rivers Stadium || || ||
|-  style="text-align:center; background:#bfb;"
| 20 || April 27 || @ Braves || || || || || Atlanta Stadium || || ||
|-  style="text-align:center; background:#bfb;"
| 21 || April 28 || @ Braves || || || || || Atlanta Stadium || || ||
|-  style="text-align:center; background:#bfb;"
| 22 || April 29 || @ Braves || || || || || Atlanta Stadium || || ||
|-  style="text-align:center; background:#bfb;"
| 23 || April 30 || @ Reds || || || || || Riverfront Stadium || || ||
|-

|-  style="text-align:center; background:#fbb;"
| 24 || May 1 || @ Reds || || || || || Riverfront Stadium || || ||
|-  style="text-align:center; background:#bfb;"
| 25 || May 2 || @ Reds || || || || || Riverfront Stadium || || ||
|-  style="text-align:center; background:#fbb;"
| 26 || May 4 || Pirates || || || || || Candlestick Park || || ||
|-  style="text-align:center; background:#bfb;"
| 27 || May 5 || Pirates || || || || || Candlestick Park || || ||
|-  style="text-align:center; background:#bfb;"
| 28 || May 7 || Braves || || || || || Candlestick Park || || ||
|-  style="text-align:center; background:#fbb;"
| 29 || May 7 || Braves || || || || || Candlestick Park || || ||
|-  style="text-align:center; background:#bfb;"
| 30 || May 9 || Braves || || || || || Candlestick Park || || ||
|-  style="text-align:center; background:#fbb;"
| 31 || May 9 || Braves || || || || || Candlestick Park || || ||
|-  style="text-align:center; background:#bfb;"
| 32 || May 10 || Reds || || || || || Candlestick Park || || ||
|-  style="text-align:center; background:#bfb;"
| 33 || May 11 || Reds || || || || || Candlestick Park || || ||
|-  style="text-align:center; background:#bfb;"
| 34 || May 12 || Reds || || || || || Candlestick Park || || ||
|-  style="text-align:center; background:#bfb;"
| 35 || May 14 || Dodgers || || || || || Candlestick Park || || ||
|-  style="text-align:center; background:#bfb;"
| 36 || May 15 || Dodgers || || || || || Candlestick Park || || ||
|-  style="text-align:center; background:#fbb;"
| 37 || May 16 || Dodgers || || || || || Candlestick Park || || ||
|-  style="text-align:center; background:#bfb;"
| 38 || May 18 || @ Cubs || || || || || Wrigley Field || || ||
|-  style="text-align:center; background:#fbb;"
| 39 || May 19 || @ Cubs || || || || || Wrigley Field || || ||
|-  style="text-align:center; background:#bfb;"
| 40 || May 20 || @ Cubs || || || || || Wrigley Field || || ||
|-  style="text-align:center; background:#fbb;"
| 41 || May 21 || @ Astros || || || || || Astrodome || || ||
|-  style="text-align:center; background:#fbb;"
| 42 || May 22 || @ Astros || || || || || Astrodome || || ||
|-  style="text-align:center; background:#bfb;"
| 43 || May 23 || @ Astros || || || || || Astrodome || || ||
|-  style="text-align:center; background:#bfb;"
| 44 || May 25 || @ Dodgers || || || || || Dodger Stadium || || ||
|-  style="text-align:center; background:#bfb;"
| 45 || May 26 || @ Dodgers || || || || || Dodger Stadium || || ||
|-  style="text-align:center; background:#fbb;"
| 46 || May 27 || @ Dodgers || || || || || Dodger Stadium || || ||
|-  style="text-align:center; background:#bfb;"
| 47 || May 28 || Expos || || || || || Candlestick Park || || ||
|-  style="text-align:center; background:#bfb;"
| 48 || May 29 || Expos || || || || || Candlestick Park || || ||
|-  style="text-align:center; background:#bfb;"
| 49 || May 30 || Expos || || || || || Candlestick Park || || ||
|-  style="text-align:center; background:#bfb;"
| 50 || May 30 || Expos || || || || || Candlestick Park || || ||
|-  style="text-align:center; background:#bfb;"
| 51 || May 31 || Mets || || || || || Candlestick Park || || ||
|-

|-  style="text-align:center; background:#fbb;"
| 52 || June 1 || Mets || || || || || Candlestick Park || || ||
|-  style="text-align:center; background:#fbb;"
| 53 || June 2 || Mets || || || || || Candlestick Park || || ||
|-  style="text-align:center; background:#fbb;"
| 54 || June 4 || Phillies || || || || || Candlestick Park || || ||
|-  style="text-align:center; background:#fbb;"
| 55 || June 5 || Phillies || || || || || Candlestick Park || || ||
|-  style="text-align:center; background:#fbb;"
| 56 || June 6 || Phillies || || || || || Candlestick Park || || ||
|-  style="text-align:center; background:#bfb;"
| 57 || June 6 || Phillies || || || || || Candlestick Park || || ||
|-  style="text-align:center; background:#fbb;"
| 58 || June 8 || @ Expos || || || || || Jarry Park Stadium || || ||
|-  style="text-align:center; background:#fbb;"
| 59 || June 9 || @ Expos || || || || || Jarry Park Stadium || || ||
|-  style="text-align:center; background:#fbb;"
| 60 || June 10 || @ Expos || || || || || Jarry Park Stadium || || ||
|-  style="text-align:center; background:#bfb;"
| 61 || June 11 || @ Mets || || || || || Shea Stadium || || ||
|-  style="text-align:center; background:#bfb;"
| 62 || June 12 || @ Mets || || || || || Shea Stadium || || ||
|-  style="text-align:center; background:#fbb;"
| 63 || June 13 || @ Mets || || || || || Shea Stadium || || ||
|-  style="text-align:center; background:#fbb;"
| 64 || June 14 || @ Phillies || || || || || Veterans Stadium || || ||
|-  style="text-align:center; background:#bfb;"
| 65 || June 15 || @ Phillies || || || || || Veterans Stadium || || ||
|-  style="text-align:center; background:#fbb;"
| 66 || June 16 || @ Phillies || || || || || Veterans Stadium || || ||
|-  style="text-align:center; background:#bfb;"
| 67 || June 18 || Padres || || || || || Candlestick Park || || ||
|-  style="text-align:center; background:#bfb;"
| 68 || June 18 || Padres || || || || || Candlestick Park || || ||
|-  style="text-align:center; background:#bfb;"
| 69 || June 19 || Padres || || || || || Candlestick Park || || ||
|-  style="text-align:center; background:#bfb;"
| 70 || June 20 || Padres || || || || || Candlestick Park || || ||
|-  style="text-align:center; background:#bfb;"
| 71 || June 20 || Padres || || || || || Candlestick Park || || ||
|-  style="text-align:center; background:#bfb;"
| 72 || June 22 || Cubs || || || || || Candlestick Park || || ||
|-  style="text-align:center; background:#bfb;"
| 73 || June 23 || Cubs || || || || || Candlestick Park || || ||
|-  style="text-align:center; background:#fbb;"
| 74 || June 25 || @ Astros || || || || || Astrodome || || ||
|-  style="text-align:center; background:#bfb;"
| 75 || June 26 || @ Astros || || || || || Astrodome || || ||
|-  style="text-align:center; background:#fbb;"
| 76 || June 27 || @ Astros || || || || || Astrodome || || ||
|-  style="text-align:center; background:#fbb;"
| 77 || June 28 || @ Padres || || || || || San Diego Stadium || || ||
|-  style="text-align:center; background:#bfb;"
| 78 || June 29 || @ Padres || || || || || San Diego Stadium || || ||
|-  style="text-align:center; background:#fbb;"
| 79 || June 30 || @ Padres || || || || || San Diego Stadium || || ||
|-

|-  style="text-align:center; background:#bfb;"
| 80 || July 1 || Cardinals || || || || || Candlestick Park || || ||
|-  style="text-align:center; background:#fbb;"
| 81 || July 2 || Cardinals || || || || || Candlestick Park || || ||
|-  style="text-align:center; background:#bfb;"
| 82 || July 3 || Cardinals || || || || || Candlestick Park || || ||
|-  style="text-align:center; background:#fbb;"
| 83 || July 4 || Dodgers || || || || || Candlestick Park || || ||
|-  style="text-align:center; background:#fbb;"
| 84 || July 5 || Dodgers || || || || || Candlestick Park || || ||
|-  style="text-align:center; background:#fbb;"
| 85 || July 6 || Astros || || || || || Candlestick Park || || ||
|-  style="text-align:center; background:#fbb;"
| 86 || July 7 || Astros || || || || || Candlestick Park || || ||
|-  style="text-align:center; background:#bfb;"
| 87 || July 8 || Astros || || || || || Candlestick Park || || ||
|-  style="text-align:center; background:#bfb;"
| 88 || July 9 || @ Dodgers || || || || || Dodger Stadium || || ||
|-  style="text-align:center; background:#bfb;"
| 89 || July 10 || @ Dodgers || || || || || Dodger Stadium || || ||
|-  style="text-align:center; background:#fbb;"
| 90 || July 11 || @ Dodgers || || || || || Dodger Stadium || || ||
|-  style="text-align:center; background:#fbb;"
| 91 || July 15 || @ Reds || || || || || Riverfront Stadium || || ||
|-  style="text-align:center; background:#bfb;"
| 92 || July 16 || @ Reds || || || || || Riverfront Stadium || || ||
|-  style="text-align:center; background:#fbb;"
| 93 || July 17 || @ Reds || || || || || Riverfront Stadium || || ||
|-  style="text-align:center; background:#bfb;"
| 94 || July 18 || @ Braves || || || || || Atlanta Stadium || || ||
|-  style="text-align:center; background:#fbb;"
| 95 || July 18 || @ Braves || || || || || Atlanta Stadium || || ||
|-  style="text-align:center; background:#bfb;"
| 96 || July 19 || @ Braves || || || || || Atlanta Stadium || || ||
|-  style="text-align:center; background:#fbb;"
| 97 || July 20 || @ Pirates || || || || || Three Rivers Stadium || || ||
|-  style="text-align:center; background:#bfb;"
| 98 || July 21 || @ Pirates || || || || || Three Rivers Stadium || || ||
|-  style="text-align:center; background:#bfb;"
| 99 || July 22 || @ Pirates || || || || || Three Rivers Stadium || || ||
|-  style="text-align:center; background:#fbb;"
| 100 || July 23 || Reds || || || || || Candlestick Park || || ||
|-  style="text-align:center; background:#bfb;"
| 101 || July 24 || Reds || || || || ||  Candlestick Park|| || ||
|-  style="text-align:center; background:#bfb;"
| 102 || July 25 || Reds || || || || || Candlestick Park || || ||
|-  style="text-align:center; background:#fbb;"
| 103 || July 25 || Reds || || || || || Candlestick Park || || ||
|-  style="text-align:center; background:#bfb;"
| 104 || July 27 || Braves || || || || || Candlestick Park || || ||
|-  style="text-align:center; background:#bfb;"
| 105 || July 28 || Braves || || || || || Candlestick Park || || ||
|-  style="text-align:center; background:#bfb;"
| 106 || July 29 || Braves || || || || || Candlestick Park || || ||
|-  style="text-align:center; background:#bfb;"
| 107 || July 30 || Pirates || || || || || Candlestick Park || || ||
|-  style="text-align:center; background:#bfb;"
| 108 || July 31 || Pirates || || || || || Candlestick Park || || ||
|-

|-  style="text-align:center; background:#bfb;"
| 109 || August 1 || Pirates || || || || || Candlestick Park || || ||
|-  style="text-align:center; background:#bfb;"
| 110 || August 1 || Pirates || || || || || Candlestick Park || || ||
|-  style="text-align:center; background:#fbb;"
| 111 || August 2 || Dodgers || || || || || Candlestick Park || || ||
|-  style="text-align:center; background:#fbb;"
| 112 || August 3 || Dodgers || || || || || Candlestick Park || || ||
|-  style="text-align:center; background:#fbb;"
| 113 || August 4 || @ Cardinals || || || || || Busch Memorial Stadium || || ||
|-  style="text-align:center; background:#fbb;"
| 114 || August 5 || @ Cardinals || || || || || Busch Memorial Stadium || || ||
|-  style="text-align:center; background:#fbb;"
| 115 || August 6 || @ Cardinals || || || || || Busch Memorial Stadium || || ||
|-  style="text-align:center; background:#fbb;"
| 116 || August 7 || @ Cubs || || || || || Wrigley Field || || ||
|-  style="text-align:center; background:#bfb;"
| 117 || August 8 || @ Cubs || || || || || Wrigley Field || || ||
|-  style="text-align:center; background:#fbb;"
| 118 || August 8 || @ Cubs || || || || || Wrigley Field || || ||
|-  style="text-align:center; background:#bfb;"
| 119 || August 10 || Expos || || || || || Candlestick Park || || ||
|-  style="text-align:center; background:#fbb;"
| 120 || August 11 || Expos || || || || || Candlestick Park || || ||
|-  style="text-align:center; background:#bfb;"
| 121 || August 13 || Mets || || || || || Candlestick Park || || ||
|-  style="text-align:center; background:#bfb;"
| 122 || August 14 || Mets || || || || || Candlestick Park || || ||
|-  style="text-align:center; background:#bfb;"
| 123 || August 15 || Mets || || || || || Candlestick Park || || ||
|-  style="text-align:center; background:#bfb;"
| 124 || August 17 || Phillies || || || || || Candlestick Park || || ||
|-  style="text-align:center; background:#bfb;"
| 125 || August 18 || Phillies || || || || || Candlestick Park || || ||
|-  style="text-align:center; background:#fbb;"
| 126 || August 20 || @ Expos || || || || || Jarry Park Stadium || || ||
|-  style="text-align:center; background:#fbb;"
| 127 || August 21 || @ Expos || || || || || Jarry Park Stadium || || ||
|-  style="text-align:center; background:#fbb;"
| 128 || August 22 || @ Expos || || || || || Jarry Park Stadium || || ||
|-  style="text-align:center; background:#bfb;"
| 129 || August 23 || @ Mets || || || || || Shea Stadium || || ||
|-  style="text-align:center; background:#bfb;"
| 130 || August 24 || @ Mets || || || || || Shea Stadium || || ||
|-  style="text-align:center; background:#fbb;"
| 131 || August 25 || @ Mets || || || || || Shea Stadium || || ||
|-  style="text-align:center; background:#bfb;"
| 132 || August 28 || @ Phillies || || || || || Veterans Stadium || || ||
|-  style="text-align:center; background:#fbb;"
| 133 || August 28 || @ Phillies || || || || || Veterans Stadium || || ||
|-  style="text-align:center; background:#bfb;"
| 134 || August 29 || @ Phillies || || || || || Veterans Stadium || || ||
|-  style="text-align:center; background:#bfb;"
| 135 || August 31 || Braves || || || || || Candlestick Park || || ||
|-

|-  style="text-align:center; background:#bfb;"
| 136 || September 1 || Braves || || || || || Candlestick Park || || ||
|-  style="text-align:center; background:#bfb;"
| 137 || September 3 || Astros || || || || || Candlestick Park || || ||
|-  style="text-align:center; background:#bfb;"
| 138 || September 4 || Astros || || || || || Candlestick Park || || ||
|-  style="text-align:center; background:#fbb;"
| 139 || September 5 || Astros || || || || || Candlestick Park || || ||
|-  style="text-align:center; background:#fbb;"
| 140 || September 5 || Astros || || || || || Candlestick Park || || ||
|-  style="text-align:center; background:#fbb;"
| 141 || September 6 || @ Dodgers || || || || || Dodger Stadium || || ||
|-  style="text-align:center; background:#fbb;"
| 142 || September 7 || @ Dodgers || || || || || Dodger Stadium || || ||
|-  style="text-align:center; background:#fbb;"
| 143 || September 8 || @ Dodgers || || || || || Dodger Stadium || || ||
|-  style="text-align:center; background:#fbb;"
| 144 || September 10 || @ Braves || || || || || Atlanta Stadium || || ||
|-  style="text-align:center; background:#fbb;"
| 145 || September 11 || @ Braves || || || || || Atlanta Stadium || || ||
|-  style="text-align:center; background:#bfb;"
| 146 || September 12 || @ Braves || || || || || Atlanta Stadium || || ||
|-  style="text-align:center; background:#fbb;"
| 147 || September 13 || Dodgers || || || || || Candlestick Park || || ||
|-  style="text-align:center; background:#fbb;"
| 148 || September 14 || Dodgers || || || || || Candlestick Park || || ||
|-  style="text-align:center; background:#fbb;"
| 149 || September 15 || Reds || || || || || Candlestick Park || || ||
|-  style="text-align:center; background:#fbb;"
| 150 || September 16 || Reds || || || || || Candlestick Park || || ||
|-  style="text-align:center; background:#bfb;"
| 151 || September 17 || Padres || || || || || Candlestick Park || || ||
|-  style="text-align:center; background:#fbb;"
| 152 || September 18 || Padres || || || || || Candlestick Park || || ||
|-  style="text-align:center; background:#bfb;"
| 153 || September 19 || Padres || || || || || Candlestick Park || || ||
|-  style="text-align:center; background:#fbb;"
| 154 || September 21 || @ Astros || || || || || Astrodome || || ||
|-  style="text-align:center; background:#bfb;"
| 155 || September 22 || @ Astros || || || || || Astrodome || || ||
|-  style="text-align:center; background:#bfb;"
| 156 || September 23 || @ Astros || || || || || Astrodome || || ||
|-  style="text-align:center; background:#fbb;"
| 157 || September 24 || @ Reds || || || || || Riverfront Stadium || || ||
|-  style="text-align:center; background:#fbb;"
| 158 || September 25 || @ Reds || || || || || Riverfront Stadium || || ||
|-  style="text-align:center; background:#bfb;"
| 159 || September 26 || @ Reds || || || || || Riverfront Stadium || || ||
|-  style="text-align:center; background:#bfb;"
| 160 || September 28 || @ Padres || || || || || San Diego Stadium || || ||
|-  style="text-align:center; background:#fbb;"
| 161 || September 29 || @ Padres || || || || || San Diego Stadium || || ||
|-  style="text-align:center; background:#bfb;"
| 162 || September 30 || @ Padres || || || || || San Diego Stadium || || ||
|-

Postseason

|-  style="text-align:center; background:#bfb;"
| 1 NLCS || October 2 || Pirates || 5–4 || Perry (1–0) || Blass (0–1) || || Candlestick Park || 40,977 || 1–0 || W1
|-  style="text-align:center; background:#fbb;"
| 2 NLCS || October 3 || Pirates || 4–9 || Ellis (1–0) || Cumberland (0–1) || || Candlestick Park || 42,562 || 1–1 || L1
|-  style="text-align:center; background:#fbb;"
| 3 NLCS || October 5 || @ Pirates || 1–2 || Johnson (1–0) || Marichal  (0–1) || Giusti (1) || Three Rivers Stadium || 38,222 || 1–2 || L2
|-  style="text-align:center; background:#fbb;"
| 4 NLCS || October 6 || @ Pirates || 5–9 || Kison (1–0) || Perry (1–1) || || Three Rivers Stadium || 35,487 || 1–3 || L3
|-

Roster

Player stats

Batting

Starters by position
Note: Pos = Position; G = Games played; AB = At bats; R = Runs scored; H = Hits; Avg. = Batting average; HR = Home runs; RBI = Runs batted in; SB = Stolen bases

Other batters
Note: G = Games played; AB = At bats; H = Hits; Avg. = Batting average; HR = Home runs; RBI = Runs batted in

Pitching

Starting pitchers
Note: G = Games pitched; IP = Innings pitched; W = Wins; L = Losses; ERA = Earned run average; SO = Strikeouts

Other pitchers
Note: G = Games pitched; IP = Innings pitched; W = Wins; L = Losses; ERA = Earned run average; SO = Strikeouts

Relief pitchers
Note: G = Games pitched; W = Wins; L = Losses; SV = Saves; ERA = Earned run average; SO = Strikeouts

National League Championship Series

The Pittsburgh Pirates win the series, 3–1, over the Giants.

Award winners
 Willie Mays, Commissioner's Award

Farm system

LEAGUE CHAMPIONS: Great Falls

References

External links
 1971 San Francisco Giants team at Baseball-Reference
 1971 San Francisco Giants team page at Baseball Almanac

San Francisco Giants seasons
San Francisco Giants season
National League West champion seasons
San Fran